Hero: The Superstar is a Bangladeshi action comedy film directed by Badiul Alam Khokon. The film stars Shakib Khan in a dual role along with Apu Biswas and Bobby as the female lead, while Amit Hasan, Shiba Shanu, Misha Sawdagor, Nuton, Rebeka Rouf And Uzzal play supporting roles. The film is loosely inspired by two  Indian films: Rebel and Naayak. The film marks the debut of Shakib Khan as a producer. 

Hero: The Superstar released on Eid-ul-Fitr of 29 July 2014 in 120 screens which was the widest release for any Bangladeshi film.

Synopsis
Hira is a software engineer by profession and very candid at heart. He is smitten by Priya and he falls in love with her. Salma Khan, Priya's sister and a local rowdy, comes to learn about Hira, and wishes to kill him.

Salma Khan puts her men on Hira's trail and arrives at a place where they plan to kill him, but things don't go as planned. Salma Khan witnesses the killing of a senior police official by Hira, only to return home in complete shock and fear. Puzzled at the sight of the murder, Salma Khan sends her entourage to investigate about Hira.

Meanwhile, a CID officer comes barging into Salma Khan's residence and takes her into custody, where she is told that Hira is wanted for the murder of several rowdies much to the astonishment of everybody. Who is Hira and what prompted him to kill? This forms the rest of the story.

Cast
 Shakib Khan as Hero/Hira
 Apu Biswas as Priya
 Eamin Haque Bobby as Bobby
 Misha Sawdagor as Jafor

Reception
Abdullah Al Amin (Rubel) of The Daily Star gave the film two stars out of five. He described the plot lines as "tried and true" and, despite being trite, praised the strong script and story. He wrote that "Shakib Khan has done yet another great job" and complimented Sawdagor's performance as the villain. He criticized the costumes and makeup.

Music

The soundtrack of Hero: The Superstar composed by Ali Akram Shuvo, Arfin Rumi and Showkat Ali Emon with the lyrics penned by Sudip Kumar Dip & Kobir Bokul. The soundtrack features 5 tracks overall.

References

External links
 

2014 films
2014 action comedy films
2014 romantic comedy films
Bengali-language Bangladeshi films
Bangladeshi action comedy films
Bangladeshi romantic comedy films
Films scored by Ali Akram Shuvo
Films scored by Shawkat Ali Emon
Films scored by Arfin Rumey
Bangladeshi remakes of Indian films
2010s Bengali-language films
Bangladeshi films about revenge
Bangladeshi remakes of Telugu films